The Church of St. Mark the Evangelist is a Roman Catholic parish church in the Roman Catholic Archdiocese of New York, located at West 138th Street, near Lenox Avenue in northern Harlem, Manhattan, New York City. The address is 59-61 West 138th Street and 195 East Lenox Avenue. The parish was established in 1907 and has been staffed by the Holy Ghost Fathers since 1912. The Rev. Charles J. Plunkett, pastor, had a brick church built in 1914 to designs by Nicholas Serracino of 1170 Broadway for $12,000.

References 

Roman Catholic churches completed in 1914
20th-century Roman Catholic church buildings in the United States
Christian organizations established in 1907
Roman Catholic churches in Manhattan
Churches in Harlem
1907 establishments in New York City